Brit Awards 2006  was the 26th show of the Brit Awards, an annual pop music awards ceremony in the United Kingdom. It was organised by the British Phonographic Industry and took place on February 14, 2006 in Earls Court in London. It attracted a mere 4.7 million viewers, one of the lowest viewed ceremonies. 2007's show went on to pass the 5 million barrier again.

The ceremony was hosted by Chris Evans, who also hosted Brit Awards 2005. It lasted about three hours, and the alcohol ban of the previous year had been relaxed. The biggest surprise performance was that from Prince, who reunited with Wendy and Lisa from The Revolution, together with Sheila E. for the performance.

2006's biggest winners were the Kaiser Chiefs, who came away with three awards. Coldplay, James Blunt and Green Day all came away with two awards, Coldplay collecting their sixth overall. Other winners included the Arctic Monkeys for their only nomination, and acts such as KT Tunstall and Kanye West. Arcade Fire were the most unsuccessful act, being nominated for three awards but winning none of them.

Performances

Winners and nominees

Multiple nominations and awards

Controversy
Some of the more famous British pop acts failed to get a nomination. Bands like Girls Aloud and McFly both had top 10 hits in both the single and album charts but neither were nominated, and Oasis who were eligible, but were snubbed in the category of Best Album, only had 2 nominations.

See also
Naomi Awards

References

External links
Brit Awards 2006 at Brits.co.uk
NME report on Brits nominations

Brit Awards
Brit Awards
Brit Awards
Brit Awards
Brit
Brit Awards